Big Blue Bug Solutions is an extermination business located in Providence, Rhode Island that services southeastern New England. The company is known for its mascot, Nibbles Woodaway (also known as the Big Blue Bug), a giant blue termite that stands atop its office next to I-95 in Providence. The company provides pest control services to both residential and commercial properties, and uses ecologically safe products, and has been recognized for promoting the use of integrated pest management in schools to protect student safety. It is also known for aiding Providence during the city's rat epidemic, and was an early adopter of converting trucks to run on natural gas. Big Blue Bug Solutions has also sponsored Little League baseball teams throughout Rhode Island. Originally named New England Pest Control, the company changed its name to Big Blue Bug Solutions in 2012 because of its mascot.

Historically, pest control companies generally advertised that their exterminators would arrive in unmarked vehicles so as to ensure that neighbors would not realize that a residence had a pest problem. Big Blue Bug Solutions was one of the first companies to mark all of its vehicles and attempt to remove the stigma from having a pest problem. Today, nearly all exterminators use marked vehicles.

Due to the prominence of the Big Blue Bug and the building's location at a high-traffic portion of the highway (near Thurbers Avenue Curve), many organizations request to have their banners hung in front of the Bug. Big Blue Bug Solutions will let non-profit organizations hang their banners on a first-come, first-served basis, with groups needing to file a request at least two years in advance. Some of the many organizations that have placed banners in front of the Bug include Make-A-Wish Foundation, Special Olympics, American Heart Association, and Girl Scouts of the USA.

Notable employees
Tony DeJesus began his career at New England Pest Control twenty-nine years ago as a service technician, and subsequently worked his way up to his current position of Service Manager. He is a nationally recognized expert in the field of structural pest management. DeJesus has been a keynote presenter at numerous pest control conferences throughout the United States, and conducts his own training program for the Rhode Island Department of Health and Division of Agriculture. Every Saturday morning at 7am, DeJesus hosts The New England Pest Control Show on News/Talk 630 WPRO, during which he answers listener questions about pest control, although the show occasionally delves into other topics, such as baseball, as DeJesus is also a renowned expert on the New York Yankees.

Clarence Cornell and Darryll – Clarence was the official handler of Darryll, a dog trained to detect termites and other insects. The pair were covered by a wide variety of media outlets, and were noted for their accuracy of pest detection. Upon turning 8, Darryll retired to live as Clarence's pet.

Notes

External links

Companies based in Providence, Rhode Island
Insect control